Spring Grove Cemetery and Arboretum is a nonprofit rural cemetery and arboretum located at 4521 Spring Grove Avenue, Cincinnati, Ohio.  It is the third largest cemetery in the United States, after the Calverton National Cemetery and Abraham Lincoln National Cemetery and is recognized as a US National Historic Landmark.

History
The cemetery dates from 1844, when members of the Cincinnati Horticultural Society formed a cemetery association. They took their inspiration from contemporary rural cemeteries such as Père Lachaise Cemetery in Paris, and Mount Auburn Cemetery in Cambridge, Massachusetts. The numerous springs and groves suggested the name "Spring Grove". On December 1, 1844, Salmon P. Chase and others prepared the Articles of Incorporation. The cemetery was designed by Howard Daniels and formally chartered on January 21, 1845. The first burial took place on September 1, 1845.

In 1855, Adolph Strauch, a renowned landscape architect, was hired to beautify the grounds. His sense and layout of the "garden cemetery" made of lakes, trees and shrubs, is what visitors today still see. He created a more open landscape by setting limits on private enclosures and monument heights. The results of the redesign earned Strauch praise in the U.S. and abroad, including from Frederick Law Olmsted and the French landscape architect Edouard André. On March 29, 2007, the cemetery was designated a National Historic Landmark. The Spring Grove Cemetery Chapel is listed separately on the National Register of Historic Places.

On October 23, 2013, cemetery staff removed a large and potentially disturbing SpongeBob SquarePants headstone from the grave of U.S. Army Corporal Kimberly Walker and another for her still-living sister a day after her funeral. The family believed they had permission from a worker, whom management said had erred. In February 2014, both parties agreed to reinstate the statues with granite slabs largely hiding them from passersby.

Description
Its grounds include 12 ponds, many fine tombstones and memorials, and various examples of Gothic Revival architecture.

As of 2005, its National Champion trees were Cladrastis kentukea and Halesia diptera; its State Champion trees included Abies cilicica, Abies koreana, Cedrus libani, Chionanthus virginicus, Eucommia ulmoides, Halesia parvifolia, Metasequoia glyptostroboides, Phellodendron amurense, Picea orientalis, Picea polita, Pinus flexilis, Pinus griffithi, Pinus monticola, Quercus cerris, Quercus nigra, Taxodium distichum, Ulmus serotina, and Zelkova serrata.

Notable burials 

See also :Category:Burials at Spring Grove Cemetery.
 

 Jacob Ammen, Civil War general
 Nicholas Longworth Anderson, Civil War colonel
 Joshua Hall Bates, Civil War general
 Richard M. Bishop, Cincinnati Mayor and Ohio Governor
 George K. Brady, United States Army officer.  Briefly commander of the Department of Alaska
 Emma Lucy Braun, botanist 
 Charles Elwood Brown, Civil War brevet brigadier general and U.S. Representative
 Sidney Burbank, Civil War colonel
 Jacob Burnet, US Senator
 Samuel Fenton Cary, Congressman, prohibitionist
 Kate Chase, daughter of Salmon Chase and Washington, D.C. Civil War socialite
 Salmon P. Chase, Chief Justice of the United States
 Henry M. Cist, Civil War brevet brigadier general
 Levi Coffin, Quaker abolitionist
 Arthur F. Devereux, Brevet Brigadier General during the Civil War; from Salem, Massachusetts
 Daniel Drake, physician and writer
 Charles L. Fleischmann, yeast manufacturer
 Joseph Benson Foraker, Governor of Ohio, U.S. Senator, Judge, American Civil War Captain
 Manning Force, Civil War Brevet Brigadier General, Medal of Honor recipient
 James Gamble, co-founder of Procter & Gamble Company
 Kenner Garrard, Civil War general
 Heinie Groh, Cincinnati Reds Hall of Fame third baseman
 Theodore Sommers Henderson, Bishop of the Methodist Episcopal Church
 Andrew Hickenlooper, Civil War general
 Joseph Hooker, Civil War general and commander of the Army of the Potomac at the Battle of Chancellorsville
 Waite Hoyt, professional baseball player; Hall of Fame pitcher
 Miller Huggins, Hall of Fame baseball manager of New York Yankees during Babe Ruth era 
Isaac M. Jordan, one of the seven founders of Sigma Chi Fraternity
John William Kilbreth, U.S. Army brigadier general during World War I
 Bernard Kroger, founder of Kroger supermarkets
 Alexander Long, Congressman
Nicholas Longworth, Father of American grape culture
Joseph Longworth, art collector and patron, son of Nicholas Longworth 
Nicholas Longworth, American politician, Speaker of the US House of Representatives, grandson of Nicholas Longworth
 William Haines Lytle, 19th century Ohio, general, politician, poet
 Joseph Mason, artist, who was an uncredited assistant to John James Audubon in illustrating the Birds of America
 Stanley Matthews, Associate Justice of the United States Supreme Court* Alexander McDowell McCook, Union army general
Charles Pettit McIlvaine, Episcopal bishop, author, educator and twice Chaplain of the United States Senate
 John McLean, Associate Justice of the United States Supreme Court
 George Hunt Pendleton, Congressman and US Senator 
 Sarah Morgan Bryan Piatt, poet
 William Procter, co-founder of Procter and Gamble
 Skip Prosser, Wake Forest University men's basketball head coach at the time of his death, former assistant and head men's basketball coach at Xavier University
 Henry Stanbery, Attorney General of the United States
 Adolph Strauch, landscape architect, designer of Spring Grove Cemetery
 Dudley Sutphin, Cincinnati attorney, judge and French Legion of Honor medal winner
 Alphonso Taft, politician, father of President of the United States William Howard Taft
 Charles Phelps Taft II, Mayor of Cincinnati and son of President William Howard Taft
 Louise Taft, second wife of Alphonso Taft and mother of William Howard Taft
 John Morgan Walden, Bishop of the Methodist Episcopal Church
 Godfrey Weitzel, Civil War general
 Frances Wright, pioneering feminist, abolitionist, and freethinker

See also 
 List of botanical gardens and arboretums in the United States
 List of National Historic Landmarks in Ohio

Notes

External links 

 Spring Grove Cemetery and Arboretum
 Forty Civil War generals buried in Spring Grove Cemetery
Spring Grove Entrance

	

Arboreta in Ohio
Cemeteries in Cincinnati
Botanical gardens in Ohio
National Register of Historic Places in Cincinnati
National Historic Landmarks in Ohio
Protected areas of Hamilton County, Ohio
Tourist attractions in Cincinnati
Gothic Revival architecture in Ohio
Historic districts on the National Register of Historic Places in Ohio
Cemeteries on the National Register of Historic Places in Ohio
Rural cemeteries